Global Mall Hsinchu is a shopping mall in East District, Hsinchu City, Taiwan that opened on February 21, 2013. The mall is located in close proximity to Hsinchu railway station. The mall closed on June 30, 2016.

History
 On February 21, 2013, Global Mall Hsinchu opened, it is the fourth branch store of Global Mall and the second outside New Taipei City.
 On June 30, 2016, the mall ended operations.

See also
 List of tourist attractions in Taiwan
 Global Mall Linkou A9
 Global Mall Taoyuan A8
 Global Mall Pingtung
 Global Mall Xinzuoying Station
 Global Mall Zhonghe

References

External links

2013 establishments in Taiwan
Shopping malls in Hsinchu City
Shopping malls established in 2013
Defunct shopping malls in Taiwan
2016 disestablishments in Taiwan
Shopping malls disestablished in 2016